Col Pearse (born 10 July 2003) is an Australian Paralympic swimmer. At the 2020 Summer Paralympics, he won the bronze medal in the 100 m butterfly S10.

Personal life
Pearse was born on 10 July 2003 in Echuca, Victoria. At the age of two, his right foot was amputated from below the ankle following a collision with a ride-on lawnmower. He still has his heel bone intact so he can walk on his stump, though his right side is about 5 cm shorter than his left so he has a pronounced limp. Pearse grew up in Echuca and, in 2018, he relocated to train with a specialist coach at the H2O Swimming Club. In 2018, he was attending St Michael's Grammar School in Melbourne.

In 2021, Pearse was awarded a Tier 2 Scholarship within the Sport Australia Hall of Fame Scholarship & Mentoring Program.

Career
Besides swimming, Pearse played junior Australian Rules football for the Lockington Cats under-12s, wearing a blue-and-white hooped prosthetic foot inspired by his beloved Geelong Football Club. In late 2016, he was selected as a member of the Australian Paralympic Development Squad. In 2019, he was selected on his first Australian swim team. At the 2019 World Para Swimming Championships in London, he won the bronze medal in the men's 100 m butterfly S10 and sixth in the men's 100 m backstroke S10 and men's 200 m individual medley SM10.

At the 2020 Tokyo Paralympics, Pearse won the bronze medal in the men's 100 metre butterfly S10 with a time of 57:66, 3 seconds slower than the gold medal winner Maksym Krypak of Ukraine who set a world record. Pearce competed in the men's 200 m individual medley SM10 and made the final where he finished fourth. He also made the final of the men's 100 m backstroke S10 where he finished eighth.

At the 2022 World Para Swimming Championships in Madeira, Pearse won two silver medals - men's 100 m butterfly S10 and Mmn's 200 m individual medley SM10.

At the 2022 Commonwealth Games in Birmingham, Pearse won the gold medal in the men's 100 m butterfly S10.

Recognition
 2022 - Victorian Institute of Sport Para Athlete of the Year

References

External links
 
 
 

2003 births
Living people
Male Paralympic swimmers of Australia
Medalists at the World Para Swimming Championships
Swimmers at the 2020 Summer Paralympics
Swimmers at the 2022 Commonwealth Games
Medalists at the 2020 Summer Paralympics
Paralympic medalists in swimming
Paralympic bronze medalists for Australia
Commonwealth Games medallists in swimming
Commonwealth Games gold medallists for Australia
People from Echuca
Australian male butterfly swimmers
Australian male medley swimmers
S10-classified Paralympic swimmers
21st-century Australian people
People educated at St Michael's Grammar School
Sportsmen from Victoria (Australia)
Medallists at the 2022 Commonwealth Games